E-52862, also known as sigma-1 receptor antagonist (S1A, S1RA), as well as MR-309, is a selective sigma-1 receptor antagonist, with a reported binding affinity of Ki = 17.0 ± 7.0 nM, selective over the sigma-2 receptor and against a panel of other 170 receptors, enzymes, transporters and ion channels. In preclinical studies, S1RA has demonstrated efficacy in relieving neuropathic pain and pain in other sensitizing conditions, associated with an improvement of the emotional negative state.

S1RA is being developed by Esteve for the treatment of neuropathic pain and the potentiation of opioid analgesia and has successfully completed Phase I clinical trials showing good safety and tolerability, and a pharmacokinetic profile compatible with once a day oral administration. Phase II clinical trials are currently underway, making S1RA the first selective sigma-1 receptor antagonist evaluated in humans for these conditions.

See also
 List of investigational analgesics

References

External links
 (Compound datasheet in Esteve company website)
 E-52862 - AdisInsight

4-Morpholinyl compunds
2-Naphthyl compounds
Pyrazoles
Sigma antagonists